The Tree Assistance Program (TAP) is an American disaster assistance program, administered by the Farm Service Agency, that makes payments for lost orchard trees and vines that produce annual crops. 

The program has been funded on an ad hoc basis, usually by emergency supplemental appropriations. Most recently, the program was funded for losses incurred between October 1, 1997, and September 30, 1998.

References 

United States Department of Agriculture